Adrian Harris, better known by his stage name Big H, is an English grime artist and rapper from Tottenham, London, United Kingdom.

Biography
Known for his distinctive style, H spent much of his life creating new music and "perfecting the flow". In 2009, H released his debut mixtape Street Crime UK.

He was originally a member of Meridian Crew before it split. Following a hiatus, Big H returned in 2012 to release "Mark of the Beast" and begin to ease himself back on to underground radio stations.

In mid-2013, Big H teamed up with the recently formed Inside Music, signing an album and management deal that would see the highly anticipated album finally released. Since then, Big H has found himself on a higher platform, appearing on Charlie Sloth's 1Xtra show, releasing another album Fire And Smoke and achieving commercial success on Meridian Dan's German Whip.

Feuds
Big H has clashed with many other grime MCs and crews, notably Trim, Roll Deep, Manga, P Money, Wiley and Scratchy.

In 2014, Big H participated in a controversial clash with P Money on Lord of the Mics 6, that ended abruptly after H pulled out of the clash.

Discography

Albums
 Street Crime UK (2009)
 Fire and Smoke (2013)
 Zing Zing Zoom, Vol 1 (2015)
The Oracle (TBC)

Singles  
 Wake Up, produced by Flash G (2011)
 Mark of the Beast, produced by Youngz (2012)
 Nike Air Max, with President T and Bossman Birdie (2017)
 Rise Above (2017)

As featured artist 
 2014: German Whip (with Meridian Dan and JME)

References

External links 

English hip hop musicians
English male rappers
Grime music artists
Living people
Rappers from London
Year of birth missing (living people)
Black British male rappers
People from Tottenham